Transparente is the third studio album by Portuguese fado singer Mariza, released on 25 April 2005 by EMI Music Portugal. It was recorded in Brazil and produced by Brazilian musician Jaques Morelenbaum.

Background and development
Transparente was recorded in Rio de Janeiro, Brazil, under the direction of Brazilian cellist, arranger and Grammy-winning music producer Jaques Morelenbaum. Mariza has claimed to be a long time fan of Morelenbaum's work, and wished to create at least a song with him.

When invited by Mariza to arrange her new album, Morelenbaum could not recuse himself, stating that despite fado being a foreign genre to him, it reminded him "that Brazil is steeped in Portuguese culture".

Composition
For Transparente, Mariza once again chose to feature both original songs and adaptations to traditional fados, a practice she follows since the release of her first studio album, Fado em Mim. The song "Malmequer" is an adaptation by Aldina Duarte to the traditional Fado Menor, whereas "Toada do desengano" is a work by Vasco Graça Moura based on Fado Franklin. Mário Raínho also contributed with his "Recusa", having developed the song from Fado Magala. The singer has stated that since she does not know how to write songs, she feels the need "to resort to the great poets and ask for help from composers and singer-songwriters" when working on new projects. This album follows this trend, once again featuring content by Fernando Pessoa, Florbela Espanca and Artur Ribeiro.

The album's homonymous song "Transparente" was written for Mariza by poet Paulo Abreu Lima, and with the idea of accentuating the singer's mixed heritage. It would feature in the 2011 album The Rough Guide to World Playtime, being described as having a "delicate beauty that is instantly infectious".

Transparente breaks with the fado tradition of accompanying the vocals only with a 12-string Portuguese guitar, by featuring instruments like the flute, the cello or the accordion.

Critical reception

Transparente received positive reviews from music critics, both in Portugal and internationally. Between 2005 and 2006, Mariza embarked on a world tour to promote the album.

When writing about a live concert in Lisbon following the release of Transparente, Nuno Galopim of Diário de Notícias considered the album to be "magnificent", with a "discreet and engaging" sound. Covering a performance at the Teatro Albéniz in Madrid, Carlos Galilea of El País pointed out the unusual instruments that featured in the album, arguing that they contributed to create a new, "extremely beautiful" sound. The critic asserted that although this approach to the genre may seem like a deviation from the roots of fado itself, Mariza was closer to fado than ever. In his review of the event, Galilea also praised the reference to the work of Fernando Pessoa, the "greatest poet born in Portugal", in the song "Há uma Música do Povo".

Clive Davis gave a very complimentary review of the album's music when covering Mariza's 2006 concert at the Royal Albert Hall in London.

In June 2017, the album was included in Blitz'''s list of the 30 best Portuguese albums of the last 30 years.

Commercial performance
The album had sold more than 15.000 copies in the Netherlands as of February 2006, becoming a golden record in the country. By that time, Transparente was already a double platinum record in Portugal, selling more than 40.000 copies since its release and, by December 2010, the album was a triple platinum record with more than 60.000 copies sold. Transparente also featured for four weeks in France's top albums chart, having peaked at number 126 in April 2005.Transparente'' became Mariza's second album to feature on Billboard's World Albums chart, where it peaked at number 7 in October 2005. In June 2005, the album had also ranked number 7 in the World Music Charts Europe, compiled monthly by the European Broadcasting Union, by then the highest position ever achieved by a Portuguese album. The album ranked number 28 in the 2005 overall list by the same organization.

Track listing

Certifications

References

Sources

2005 albums
Mariza albums